Scammell Lorries Limited was a British manufacturer of trucks, particularly specialist and military off-highway vehicles, between 1921 and 1988.

History
Scammell started as a late-Victorian period wheelwright and coach-building business, G Scammell & Nephew Ltd in Spitalfields, London. George Scammell, the founder, was joined by his nephew Richard and Richard's sons Alfred and James. By the early 1900s, the firm had become financially stable, providing maintenance to customers of Foden steam wagons. One such customer, Edward Rudd, had imported a Knox Automobile tractor from the United States, and impressed with its low weight/high hauling power had asked Scammell if they could make a similar model of their own.

However, the outbreak of World War I in 1914 stopped the project and presented itself as a turning point in road transport history. Mechanical transport was seen to work, proving its vast potential beyond doubt to forward-thinking companies such as Scammell. George Scammell's great nephew, Lt. Col. Alfred Scammell, was injured and invalided out of the army, and he was able to apply the practical experience he had gained during the war and began developing the articulated six wheeler. Percy G Hugh, chief designer, conceived the idea and at the 1920 Commercial Motor Show, 50 orders were taken for the new design.

Scammell Lorries

Scammell started production of the 7.5-ton articulated vehicle in 1920. Needing to move to new premises, Scammell & Nephew floated a new company, Scammell Lorries Ltd in July 1922, with Lt. Col. Scammell as managing director. The original company remained in business in Fashion Street, Spitalfields refurbishing and bodybuilding until taken over in 1965 by York Trailer Co.

In 1929, Scammell designed and manufactured the "100 Tonner" low loader. Only two were produced; the first was delivered to Marston Road Services, Liverpool, for the transportation of steam engines to Liverpool docks. Scammell were also looking for new markets, and diversified into four- and six-wheel rigid (nonarticulated) designs. The 'Rigid Six-wheeler' found some success and, with its balloon tyres, at last permitted sustained high-speed, long-distance road operation.

In 1934, Scammell produced the three-wheeled Mechanical Horse, designed by Oliver North to replace horses in rail, postal and other delivery applications. This featured automatic carriage coupling and the single front wheel could be steered through 360 degrees. It was sold in three- and six-ton versions. The three-tonner was powered by a 1,125-cc side-valve petrol engine and the six-tonner by a 2,043-cc engine. Karrier had introduced a similar vehicle, the Cob, four years earlier.

From 1937, a Citroën Traction Avant powered version was made under licence in France, by Chenard-Walcker-FAR, known as the Pony Mécanique. This continued in production, in various versions, until 1970.

In the late 1940s, the Mechanical Horse was superseded by the Scammell Scarab, with similar features, but a much less angular cab and now with a 2,090-cc, side-valve petrol engine in both models and a diesel version with a Perkins engine.

The company mainly concentrated on articulated and rigid eight-wheeler lorries, from the 1920s. One vehicle not in those lines that became well-known was the 6×4 Pioneer. This was an off-highway, heavy haulage tractor, first produced in 1927. This design was the work of Oliver Danson North. The Pioneer proved popular in the oil field and forestry (logging) markets, and formed the basis of the British Army's World War II R100 30-ton tank transporter. With the outbreak of war, development of new vehicles stopped and production concentrated on military Pioneers for use as artillery tractors, recovery and transporter vehicles.

Leyland Group subsidiary

Post war, foreign competition and rationalisation of the UK manufacturers led to Scammell coming under Leyland Motors in 1955. This provided access to ready-made components within the Leyland group, allowing the replacement of the "lightweight" range with the:
Highwayman: bonneted 4x2
Routeman: forward control 8-wheeler
Handyman: forward control 4x2
Both the tractor units could be configured up to 50 tons (50.8 Tonnes or 55 short tons), and complemented by the full range of Scammell trailers made at the Moor Park works, allowed the company to continue production in specialist and military markets.

In the 1960s, Scammell contracted Giovanni Michelotti to design its cabs, resulting in a series of glass-reinforced plastic "spring"-like designs. The first to be redesigned was the Routeman, followed by the Handyman. In 1967, the 'Scarab' was replaced by the 'Townsman', which also had a GRP body. The factory also designed the 6x4 Contractor equipped with a Cummins 335 engine, Lipe clutch and Fuller semi-automatic gearbox, that went into production in 1964. Offered with a choice of Leyland 24 tonne or Scammell 30 and 40 tonne bogies, the Contractor was popular in the UK for 240+ ton GTW operation, overseas heavy haul, and with the military for tank transport.

In 1964, Scammell assembled 38 BUT RETB/1 trolleybuses for use in Wellington, New Zealand.

Scammell launched the three-axle 6x4 Crusader at London's 1968 Earl's Court Commercial Vehicle Show. The truck was designed for high-speed long-distance transport, typically to cover 250,000 miles a year. The truck included a 'repair by replacement' philosophy to cut downtime and the consequences of unscheduled maintenance. The drive line included a 9.3-litre GM Detroit Diesel 8V71N two-stroke diesel engine, rated at 273 bhp. This drove through a Fuller RoadRanger 16-speed constant-mesh gear box, to an Albion double-drive and two-spring bogie, using double reduction and cross lockable drive axles. The final reduction took place in the hubs to give better ground clearance under the differential housings. Scammell used the same rear bogie on its highly successful 24-ton Double Drive Routeman 8x4 tipper chassis, launched at the same exhibition. As most contemporary 32-ton and maximum capacity trucks in the UK had engine power ratings of between 150 and 220 bhp, the Crusader's 273 bhp attracted immediate attention, much of it unfavourable from deeply conservative operators.

With active encouragement from Walter Batstone, then transport engineering boss at British Road Services, Scammell quickly developed a two-axle model, powered initially by a Rolls-Royce Eagle six-cylinder diesel engine, rated at 220 or 280 bhp, depending on customers' preferences. This new model appeared at the November 1969 Scottish Motor Show at Kelvin Hall.

Scammell went on to develop a heavy haulage model, the Samson, basically a four-axle 8x4 Crusader. It sold in limited numbers in a specialised market sector.

The 1970s started with a reorganisation of the Leyland Group, with heavy haul after the closure of the old Thornycroft works in 1972 concentrated on the newly named Scammell Motors site at Watford. The Thornycroft 6x4 Nubian heavy dumptruck was the first transfer inwards, regularly adapted for the military, followed by the lighter LD55 6x4 dumptruck.

In the late 1970s, the Contractor Mk2 was developed, together with the Scammell Commander tank transporter for the British Army. Fitted with the Rolls-Royce CV12TCE 26-litre, 48-valve dual-turbocharged 625 hp intercooled V12 diesel engine, semi-automatic gearbox and Scammell 40-ton bogie, it was plated at 100 ton+ GTW. Because it was intended as part of the strategy to defend West Germany's eastern Iron Curtain border against tank attack, it was designed to achieve the same acceleration and braking performances as a contemporary commercial 32 tractor. Both tractors were brought into production within the newly built "moving line" construction shop, which gave Scammell a modern state-of-the-art factory. The Commander fleet came into operation in 1983.

In the late 1970s, Leyland Group decided to develop two new tractors: the overseas bonneted Landtrain; the UK forward control Roadtrain. Scammell was contracted to develop the Landtrain, which used the same cab and bonnet as the Commander replacement, the S24. Equipped with Cummins NT 350 or 400 engine, the S24 could be specified from 40 tonnes GVW to more than 200 tonnes GTW. Scammell also gained the contract to develop and build the eight-wheeled version of the Roadtrain, the Constructor8. This also allowed Scammell to develop and produce the complementary S26 range of heavy-haul 4x2, 6x2 and 6x4 tractors, which was a parts-bin build from the Roadtrain and 24 components.

Closure

In 1986, Scammell tendered for the British Army hooklift DROPS tender, using the newly developed 8x6 variant of the S24. This was equipped with a Rolls-Royce 350 engine, ZF automatic gearbox and Kirkstall axles. However, shortly after winning the contract to supply 1,522 such vehicles, Leyland group was bought by DAF of the Netherlands. DAF elected to build the S26 DROPS at the Leyland plant in Lancashire, and to close the Watford factory.

DAF closed the plant in July 1988. It sold the site for redevelopment, and further sold the rights to manufacture (but not the rights to the name nor the premises) of the S24, Nubian, Crusader, and Commander to Alvis Unipower. They opened a new plant in West Watford, offering ongoing support and spare parts for Scammell vehicles.

The Tolpits Lane site was redeveloped into a housing estate, the Vale Industrial Estate, and a business park. Tenants include the Camelot Group.

In popular culture
In the children's TV series Thomas & Friends, the road vehicle characters Butch, Max and Monty, Madge and Nelson are all based on Scammell vehicles. 
An S24 Tank Transporter is Jill's vehicle in the Terry Gilliam film Brazil.
“Eighteen wheeler Scammells” was among the reason to be cheerful in Ian Dury and the Blockheads 1979 hit single Reasons To Be Cheerful Part 3.
A Scammell S24 is featured in the off-roading video game Snowrunner. In-game it is called the Royal BM17.

Vehicle list

80 Tonner
100 Tonner
Commander
Constructor
Constructor 6WD
Contractor
Contractor 8X4
Crusader – See below
Explorer 6X6
Handyman – See below
Highwayman
Himalayan
Mechanical Horse, Scarab and Townsman
Mountaineer 4WD
Pioneer, Pioneer Semi-trailer (tank transporter)
Rigid Eight
Rigid Six
Routeman
S24 6X4 
S24 6WD
S26 6WD
S26 8WD
S26
Samson 8X4
Showtrac – Showman's tractor fitted with generator for fairground ride haulage and power supply
Trunker – See below

Products

Rigid 6/8

The Rigid 6 and Rigid 8, for the number of wheels, were produced from 1937 to 1958.

Showtrac
The Showtrac was a short-wheelbase 4x2 ballast tractor, one of the few vehicles ever designed specifically for fairground use. It could be supplied with a rear body (with half-height roller shutter access doors), winch, and dynamo with the ballast block underneath. Eighteen were built, to varying specifications (not all had the body fitted, for example), between December 1945 and September 1948. Seventeen have been preserved. There are many look-alike Scammell tractors, but genuine Showtracs had a special "Showtrac" badge on the radiator, and a full-width cab.

Handyman

The Handyman initially used a glass-fibre cab designed by Scammell – for the Mark 2 and 3 versions a new Michelotti-designed "cheesegrater" fibreglass cab as used on the 2nd and 3rd versions of the Routeman Rigid was fitted.

Early versions were equipped with Scammell's own "gate-change" gearbox but subsequent versions were fitted with AEC and David Brown gearboxes.

Engines fitted included the Leyland 680, Gardner 150 and Rolls-Royce 220.

Trunker
The Trunker was a three-axle version of the Handyman.

Contractor
The Contractor was a 6x4 tractor used by various operators including the Australian Army as a tank transporter or as heavy haulage, usually engineering plant for the Royal Australian Engineers. The Australian military units were configured with 335HP Cummins diesel engines and pneumocyclic gearboxes. While one of the trials vehicles which served in the Vietnam War was branded with the Scammell name, most of the remaining units were branded Leyland. Two trailer specifications were used, a 24-wheel float with 16 wheel dolly trailer for transporting the Australian Centurion tank or US Patton tank in Vietnam.  The other trailer was a 40 Ton 12 wheel Steco folding goose neck trailer for the engineering plant.

Crusader
The Crusader was a 4×2 or 6×4 tractor that used a Motor Panels-supplied steel cab, available in sleeper- or day-cab forms. It had the option of Detroit Diesel, Cummins, Rolls-Royce or Leyland engines.

The Crusader was used by the British Army as a 6×4 tow-truck (with EKA underlift equipment) and as a 6x4 tractor unit normally used for towing 35–tonne plant trailers or 30–tonne tank bridge transport trailers. A recovery variant was also in use. The British Army replaced the Crusader in the late 1990s by a Seddon Atkinson tractor unit with a 40–tonne plant trailer and a specialist tank bridge transporter.
Many have seen use in the heavy haulage industry due to their incredibly strong chassis. The special heavy haulage tractor was the Crusader based Samson 8×4 with tridem axles.

The military specification vehicles were usually equipped with 15-speed Fuller gearboxes and an 8–tonne capstan winch.

Commander tank transporter
The Commander was introduced as a tank transporter in 1978. Designed in the late 1970s, they replaced the Thornycroft Antars in the British Army beginning with the delivery of the first one on 30 March 1984 followed by others totaling 125 units. The 6×4 units could carry a load of 65 tonnes and were used to transport Challenger II tanks. Used during the Gulf War, they were retired in 2002 and replaced by the Oshkosh M1070F HET.

Designed to tow loads up to 65 tonnes, the Commander tows a special semi-trailer onto which tanks can be tail-loaded using a hydraulic 20–tonne capacity winch. A prominent bonnet houses the vehicle's Perkins (Rolls-Royce) CV 12 TCE V12 and although the Commander is powered by the Perkins/Rolls-Royce engine, other types were also proposed – one of the prototypes used a Cummins KTA 600 diesel. The cab has provision for up to three or four passengers and there is space for two bunks behind the front seats. Due to the front axle lock angle, the Commander is highly maneuverable and can negotiate a 'T' intersection with only 9.15 meters between the walls.

In 1988 the Leyland group including Scammell company was bought by DAF, the rights to the Commander were sold Unipower Ltd, who opened a new plant in West Watford.

In 1990 during the operation Desert Storm 70 Scammell Commander heavy tank transporters were used to transport 40 types of various military cargo. Each of the vehicles was on the road 17 hours a day during a 4-month period and on average each vehicle traveled 270 km a day on the desert roads. Most of the 125 British Army Commanders were based in Belgium and Germany, with only a few in the United Kingdom.

See also
Ballast tractor
Oliver Danson North

Gallery

References

External links

History of Scammell, at The Scammell Register
Scammell enthusiast site
A Scammell Crusader Owners Site

Armoured fighting vehicles of the United Kingdom
Companies based in Watford
Defunct truck manufacturers of the United Kingdom
Emergency services equipment makers
Former defence companies of the United Kingdom
History of the tank
History of Watford
Leyland Motors
 
Vehicle manufacturing companies established in 1921
Vehicle manufacturing companies disestablished in 1988
1921 establishments in England
1988 disestablishments in England